Pithubar Girls' Degree College, established in 1989, is a women's general degree college situated at Khowang, in Dibrugarh district, Assam. This college is affiliated with the Dibrugarh University. This college offers bachelor's degree courses in arts and commerce.

References

External links

Women's universities and colleges in Assam
Colleges affiliated to Dibrugarh University
Educational institutions established in 1989
1989 establishments in Assam